, also known by his Chinese style name , was a bureaucrat of the Ryukyu Kingdom.

Chatan Chōchō was an uncle of the famous sessei Shō Shōken. He served as a member of Sanshikan from 1652 to 1666.

In 1663, King Shō Shitsu dispatched Chatan as a gratitude envoy for his investiture to Qing China. The mission stayed at Fuzhou on their way home the next year. King Shō Shitsu dispatched Eso Jūkō (also known as Ei Jōshun ) as a congratulatory envoy to celebrate Kangxi Emperor's coronation at the same time. But Eso's envoy was shipwrecked near Meihua Port (a port in modern Changle, Fuzhou) in the mouth of Min River, and was attacked by pirates. Eso fled to Fuzhou, some of his entourage were murdered by poison, and golden pots prepared for Kangxi Emperor were stolen.  

Two envoys came back to Ryukyu in 1665. Soon Chatan found the truth: the pirates were actually Ryukyuans disguised as Chinese, and all of them were his entourage. When the ship passed by Iheya Island, he threw all participants into the sea in order to hush up the incident. But finally the truth was known by Satsuma Domain. Both Chatan and Eso were sentenced to death by Satsuma, and decapitated by Ryukyu Kingdom.

References

1607 births
1667 deaths
People executed by decapitation
Ueekata
Sanshikan
People of the Ryukyu Kingdom
Ryukyuan people
17th-century Ryukyuan people